In mathematics, the Rogers–Szegő polynomials are a family of  polynomials orthogonal on the unit circle introduced by , who was inspired by the continuous q-Hermite polynomials studied by Leonard James Rogers. They are given by

where (q;q)n is the descending q-Pochhammer symbol.

Furthermore, the  satisfy (for ) the recurrence relation

References

Orthogonal polynomials
Q-analogs